The varied honeyeater (Gavicalis versicolor) is a species of bird in the family Meliphagidae.
It is found in coastal areas of New Guinea and eastern Cape York Peninsula.
Its natural habitat is subtropical or tropical mangrove forests.

The varied honeyeater was previously placed in the genus Lichenostomus, but was moved to Gavicalis after molecular phylogenetic analysis, published in 2011, showed that the original genus was polyphyletic.

Gallery

References 

varied honeyeater
Birds of New Guinea
Birds of Cape York Peninsula
varied honeyeater
Taxonomy articles created by Polbot